Toko is a small rural settlement near Stratford, New Zealand.

Toko may also refer to:

Locations
 Toko, Cameroon, a commune in Cameroon
 Toko, Queensland, a locality in the Shires of Boulia and Diamantina, Queensland, Australia
 Tōkō, the former Japanese name for Donggang, Pingtung, Taiwan
 Toko (architecture), a Japanese architectural feature
 Toko-Stanovik, a mountain range in Russia
 Bolshoye Toko (Big Toko), a lake in Russia
 As an abbreviation of Tokomairiro or Tokomairaro, New Zealand:
 Toko Mouth, a settlement near Milton
 Tokomairiro High School, Milton
 Tokomairaro River

People and fictional characters
Given name
Toko Fukawa (腐川 冬子), fictional character in Danganronpa 
, fictional character in Kara no Kyōkai
, Japanese screenwriter
, Japanese manga artist
 Toko Ratana (1894–1944), New Zealand politician
, Japanese ink painting artist
 Toko Yasuda, Japanese electronic musician

Surname
 Esther Toko (born 2000), Nigerian rower
, Japanese ice hockey player
, Japanese ice hockey player
 Nabatingue Toko (born 1952), Chadian footballer
 Nzuzi Toko (born 1990), Cameroonian footballer
 Salwa Toko (born 1975), French diversity and digital literacy activist

Other
 Tōko (game), Japanese version of the East Asian pitch-pot game
 Toko (shop), a shop for Asian products in the Netherlands
 Toko Ski Wax, a brand of Swix
 Toko University, Taiwan

See also

 Togo, country in Africa
 Tokyo, capital of Japan
 Toco, Cochabamba, Bolivia
Tonko

Japanese-language surnames

Japanese feminine given names